Islara U. Rodríguez Vega (born 24 April 1988) is an American-born Puerto Rican lawyer and a retired footballer who has played as a forward. She has been a member of the Puerto Rico women's national team.

Early and personal life
Rodríguez was born and raised in Houston, Texas to José Rodríguez and Amarilis Vega. She has married a Turk named Volkan Irgit.

International goals
Scores and results list Puerto Rico's goal tally first.

References

1988 births
Living people
Women's association football forwards
21st-century Puerto Rican lawyers
Puerto Rican women lawyers
Puerto Rican women's footballers
Puerto Rico women's international footballers
Competitors at the 2010 Central American and Caribbean Games
Texas lawyers
American women's soccer players
Soccer players from Houston
American sportspeople of Puerto Rican descent
Houston Cougars women's soccer players
21st-century American women lawyers
21st-century American lawyers